This is a list of lighthouses in New Brunswick.

Lighthouses

See also
List of lighthouses in Canada

References

External links

 New Brunswick Lighthouses Lighthouses Friends. Retrieved 18 February 2017
 List of Lights, Buoys and Fog Signals Canadian Coast Guard. Retrieved 18 February 2017

 
Newfoundland and Labrador
Lighthouses